Pierre Louis Parisis (17 August 1795 – 1866) was the Roman Catholic bishop of the Bishopric of Langres in Haute-Marne, France, from 1835 to 1851.

Biography
Parisis was born in 1795. In 1835 he was consecrated as bishop of Arras. Later he became bishop of Boulogne and St. Omer.

In 1847 he formed the Archconfraternity of Reparation for blasphemy and the neglect of Sunday to promote Acts of Reparation to Jesus Christ. He is also noted for his efforts within the Assembly of 1848 for establishing the ecclesiastical college of St. Dizier and for his discussions concerning the educational reforms. He was a member of the commission which prepared the draft project for the Falloux Laws increasing the Catholic clergy's influence in French education.

Parisis was the founder and editor of the Revue des sciences ecclesiastioues, and the author of some apologetical works.

Notes

1795 births
1866 deaths
Catholic spirituality
Bishops of Arras
Bishops of Langres